Kudgi Super Thermal Power Station is a power station located at Kudgi village of Basavana Bagewadi Taluq in Bijapur district, Karnataka in Indian state of Karnataka. This is one of the coal based thermal power plants of NTPC Limited.

The coal for the plant will be derived from NTPC's Pakhri Barwadih coal block in Jharkhand.

The Construction Power required for stage-1 erection was drawn from M/s Hescom (Hubli Electricity Supply Company) through 2 no. of dedicated 33kV OH lines from Basavana Bagewadi and Mattihal substations of Hescom.

The water source is from reservoir of Almatti Dam which is constructed on Krishna River.

Capacity
Kudgi Super Thermal Power Project will have an installed capacity of 4000 MW (3x800 MW in first stage and 2x800 MW in second stage). Doosan Power systems India Pvt Ltd will supply Steam Generator for the plant & Toshiba JSW Power Systems Pvt Ltd will supply super-critical steam turbine and generator and L&T Howden will supply Axial fans to NTPC for the plant.

References

External links

 Kudgi Super Thermal Power Project at SourceWatch

Coal-fired power stations in Karnataka
Buildings and structures in Bijapur district
2016 establishments in Karnataka
Energy infrastructure completed in 2016